Richard Lane Hudson Jr. (born November 4, 1971) is an American politician serving as the U.S. representative for North Carolina's 9th congressional district since 2013 (previously numbered the 8th district). A member of the Republican Party, his district covers a large part of the southern Piedmont area from Concord to Spring Lake.

Early life and education
Hudson was born in Franklin, Virginia, but has lived in the Charlotte area since childhood. He graduated from Myers Park High School in 1990. He attended the University of North Carolina at Charlotte and graduated Omicron Delta Kappa in 1996 with a bachelor's degree in political science and history. He also served as student body president and president of the College Republicans, and was a member of the Kappa Alpha Order social fraternity.

Early career 
Active in politics for many years, Hudson served as district director for 8th District Congressman Robin Hayes from 1999 to 2005.  At various times, he served on the staffs of Republicans Virginia Foxx, John Carter and Mike Conaway. He also served as communications director for the North Carolina Republican Party in the mid-1990s. In 1996 he worked on Richard Vinroot's campaign for governor, and in 2008 as campaign manager for Pat McCrory's run for governor. Hudson was the president of Cabarrus Marketing Group, a small business consulting and marketing company he started in 2011 and dissolved upon his election to Congress.

U.S. House of Representatives

Elections
2012

Hudson ran for Congress in North Carolina's 8th congressional district. He won the July 17 Republican primary runoff with 64% of the vote against Scott Keadle and faced Democratic incumbent Larry Kissell in November. The district had been made significantly more Republican in redistricting, losing most of its share of Charlotte and picking up several heavily Republican areas northeast of the city.

At a primary campaign event in April 2012, Hudson told a Tea Party group, "there's no question President Obama is hiding something on his citizenship." He later apologized for his comments and said he accepted that Obama was born in the United States.

Hudson spoke at the 2012 Republican National Convention in Tampa, Florida, on August 28, 2012. He was elected with 54% of the vote to Kissell's 46% and took office in January 2013.

2014

Hudson was opposed by Antonio Blue in the general election and won 64.9% to 35.1%.

2016

In 2016, Hudson was challenged by Tim D'Annunzio in the primary election. He won with 64.6% of the vote to D'Annunzio's 35.4%. In the general election, Hudson defeated Democrat Thomas Mills 58.8%–41.2%.

2018

2020

Hudson defeated Democrat Patricia Timmons-Goodson in the November 3 general election.

Committee assignments

At the beginning of the 116th Congress, Hudson was assigned to the Committee on Energy and Commerce, Subcommittee on Energy, Subcommittee on Health and Subcommittee on Consumer Protection and Commerce.

Caucus membership 

 Republican Study Committee

Tenure
According to The Sandhills Sentinel, Hudson holds a conservative position on gun control, opposes abortion, and has been "a leading advocate of opioid reform."

In 2014, Hudson proposed prohibiting EPA officials from using airplane travel for official travel.

In 2015, Hudson cosponsored a resolution to amend the Constitution to ban same-sex marriage.

Hudson sponsored a bill to improve airport security in reaction to the 2013 Los Angeles International Airport shooting. Representative John Katko reintroduced the bill, which became law in the 114th Congress.

Hudson supported President Donald Trump's 2017 executive order to impose a temporary ban on entry to the U.S. to citizens of seven Muslim-majority countries, saying, "At a time of grave security threats, President Trump is right to pause the flow of refugees from countries where terrorism is rampant until we can properly vet them and implement additional screening for individuals traveling to and from these countries."

Hudson favors repealing the Affordable Care Act (Obamacare) and has voted to repeal it.

In December 2020, Hudson was one of 126 Republican members of the House of Representatives to sign an amicus brief in support of Texas v. Pennsylvania, a lawsuit filed at the United States Supreme Court contesting the results of the 2020 presidential election, in which Joe Biden defeated Trump. The Supreme Court declined to hear the case on the basis that Texas lacked standing under Article III of the Constitution to challenge the results of an election held by another state.

On January 6, 2021, Hudson was one of 147 Republican lawmakers who objected to the certification of electoral votes from the 2020 presidential election after a mob of Trump supporters stormed the U.S. Capitol and forced an emergency recess of Congress. On May 19, 2021, Hudson and all seven other House Republican leaders voted against establishing a national commission to investigate the January 6, 2021, attack on the United States Capitol Complex. Thirty-five Republican House members and all 217 Democrats present voted to establish such a commission.

Personal life
Hudson's wife, Renee, was chief of staff for Kellyanne Conway. Hudson attends Crossroads Church (Concord, North Carolina), which is a United Methodist congregation.

References

External links
Congressman Richard Hudson official U.S. House website
Richard Hudson for Congress

 
 

|-

|-

|-

|-

1971 births
21st-century American politicians
Living people
American Methodists
People from Cabarrus County, North Carolina
People from Franklin, Virginia
Republican Party members of the United States House of Representatives from North Carolina
United States congressional aides
Methodists from North Carolina